Kuraan is an ethnic minority of Sudan. It likely numbers more than 50,000 persons. This minority is mainly Muslim. They speak Arabic.

References
Joshua Project

Ethnic groups in Sudan